The Asia-Pacific Telecommunity (APT) band plan is a type of segmentation of the 612–806 MHz band (usually referred to as the 600 MHz & 700 MHz bands) formalized by the APT in 2022–2023 and 2008-2010 respectively and specially configured for the deployment of mobile broadband technologies (e.g. most notably Long Term Evolution, LTE). This segmentation exists in two variants, FDD and TDD, that have been standardized by the 3rd Generation Partnership Project (3GPP) and recommended by the International Telecommunication Union (ITU) as segmentations A5 and A6, respectively. The APT band plan has been designed to enable the most efficient use of available spectrum. Therefore, this plan divides the band into contiguous blocks of frequencies that are as large as possible taking account of the need to avoid interference with services in other frequency bands. As the result, the TDD option (segmentation A6) includes 100 MHz of continuous spectrum, while the FDD option (segmentation A5) comprises two large blocks, one of 45 MHz for uplink transmission (mobile to network) in the lower part of the band and the other also of 45 MHz for downlink transmission in the upper part. As defined in the standard, both FDD and TDD schemes for the 700 MHz band include guard bands of 5 MHz and 3 MHz at their lower and upper edges, respectively. The FDD version also includes a centre gap of 10 MHz. The guard bands serve the purpose of mitigating interference with adjacent bands while the FDD centre gap is required to avoid interference between uplink and downlink transmissions. The two arrangements are shown graphically in figures 1 and 2.

Existing 3GPP standards for the APT band plan are given below:

Table 1. 3GPP standard bands for the APT segmentation of the 600 and 700 MHz bands

Allocation of the 700 MHz band (that in many parts of the world is commonly referred to as the Digital Dividend) to mobile communications it is one of the key solutions for meeting the mobile data explosion challenge faced by the telecommunications industry and telecommunications regulators seeking additional spectrum for the deployment of new mobile broadband networks and capacity. As of today, the APT band plan is considered to be the most effective way to segment the 700 MHz band from the point of view of modern spectrum management. The superior spectral efficiency of this plan is explained further in this article. Currently, the FDD configuration is the one which has been studied most widely and is much more popular across the world. For this reason, the FDD APT band plan option is generally referred to as the APT band plan.

History 

Table 2. Milestones of the development of the 700 MHz band

Worldwide regulation status for the APT band plan by country 

Table 3. Worldwide regulation status for the APT band plan by country

Advantages

General 

The APT band plan has been developed over a 2.5 year period and was based on considerable technical studies by industry and governments. For the overall success of the creation of the harmonized band plan, high degree of cooperation among industry stakeholders (governments, vendors, operators, associations, and other) was key. As a result, the APT band plan is very well-thought from the technical point of view and is able to meet modern and future requirements by networks, user equipment and growing demand of connectivity.

Economic

Potential for economies of scale 
Because many countries across the globe have adopted the APT band plan, substantial economies of scale are bound to be created. That will lead to personal devices' and network elements' price erosion and thus, also to increasingly higher penetration of mobile devices and mobile internet.

Room for more competition 

The APT band plan allows that up to 4 operators could receive wide spectrum blocks (2x 10 MHz in this case), or 3 operators getting 2x 15 MHz each, or other mixed configurations. On the other hand, in the US, there are only three commercial operators using the band, with two operators (AT&T and Verizon Wireless), each having 2x 10 MHz of spectrum and T-Mobile having 2x 5 Mhz of spectrum.

Potentially, the most harmonized band in the world 

The APT band plan has already become a multi-regionally harmonized spectrum band that will provide a coherent ecosystem for LTE devices. Most Asian countries have already opted for the APT band; there is a strong evidence of a rising regional consensus among the vast majority of Latin American countries. Europe's "second" digital dividend matches the second duplexer of the APT band plan which implies that the user equipment, as well as network elements will be compatible with those of the APT band plan. Additionally, some Middle East and African countries have already shown their preference of the APT band plan. Countries in the Caribbean such as Cuba, Dominican Republic and Trinidad and Tobago have also adopted the APT band plan.

Spectrum planning flexibility 

The APT band plan allows greater national spectrum planning flexibility for governments all over the world, giving the possibility to adjust channel sizes to necessities of particular market and country by allocating blocks ranging from 2x 5 MHz up to 2x 20 MHz.

Technical

Full interoperability 

With the inclusion of two-duplexer system in the devices and network equipment, full interoperability is guaranteed across the entire band of the APT band plan. In a nutshell, it means that any user will be able to use his/her mobile device in any network in the 700 MHz band where the APT band plan is used, regardless of the mobile operator and the country. On the contrary, in the US band plan, there are two or three different device ecosystems which translate to non-interoperability within the country, and severe limitations (most probably, practically unavailability) of international roaming.

Wide channel size 

The APT band plan represents two blocks of 45 MHz of contiguous spectrum. This enables operators to enjoy much wider channels comparing to the blocks available within the US band plan. That translates to much greater efficiency of networks, higher data throughput levels, lower latency and less investments needed for network deployment, all other factors being equal. Wider channel sizes are crucially important for the networks of the nearest future because of the growth of mobile data and projected capacity demand.

Strong protective measures against interference 

The APT band plan assures appropriate protective measures for other services in adjacent bands which allow avoiding harmful interference from TV services in lower bands as well as from cellular networks in upper bands. In the same manner, the center gap of 10 MHz protects the band from self-interference.

Adaptiveness to future technological demands 

In the near future, the phenomenon of asymmetric traffic (when downlink experiences more traffic than uplink) can be mitigated by applying signal processing techniques that are currently under consideration in the standards development process for the APT band plan. Examples of such techniques are: skewing the number of MIMO antennas to the side where higher traffic is needed, Multi-user MIMO, and other methods.

Challenges

“Competition” with the US band plan 

US band plan was developed significantly earlier than the APT band plan. As of today, there are successful deployments of LTE networks in the USA. Due to this fact, the ecosystem of this band plan is relatively well-developed with two large networks already operating commercially and with a number of user devices existing on the market. The APT band plan does not yet enjoy a ready ecosystem and, therefore, has to “compete” with the US band plan in order to become the preferred way for countries to segment the band.

The ecosystem of devices and network elements is yet to be developed 

Another existing challenge is the advancement of its own ecosystem, which in turn depends on equipment vendors: terminal devices manufacturers (HTC, Apple, Samsung, Nokia, etc.), producers of parts of terminals (such as Qualcomm) and vendors that manufacture network elements (Ericsson, Nokia Siemens Networks, Alcatel-Lucent, Huawei, etc.). The development of the ecosystem depends heavily on the demand that exists on the market and is a function of the created economies of scale.

China’s intention to use the TDD configuration of the APT band plan 

Most likely, China will follow the TDD configuration of the APT band plan, thus most probably becoming one of a handful of markets in the world that support such configuration, but still an important and large one. Even Taiwan, one of China's closest neighbors, adopted the FDD version of the APT band plan. Furthermore, TDD configuration is technologically in many ways inferior to the FDD one. (It should be said, however, that in a number cases the TDD configuration proves to have certain advantages, such as larger capacity to bear with downlink disproportionately exceeding the uplink data transmission). In the same time, the TDD configuration of the 700 MHz, as it is seen today, is not expected to form part of the same ecosystem as the FDD mode either of the APT band plan, or of the US band plan. Therefore, it will not add up to economies of scale of neither of the two and a completely separate ecosystem might likely be developed.

Two duplexers issue 

In the APT 700 FDD configuration, two overlapping duplexers are required to cover the entire band due to the limitations by current filter technologies. The existence of two duplexers in the APT band plan and the fact that European, Japanese (and perhaps some other future networks) will only work with one duplexer set, raise a question of whether user and network equipment manufacturers will incorporate both duplexers in their equipment or will create two parallel configurations – one with only one duplexer and another one with both of them. Presence of both configurations would lead to less significant economies of scale for each type of the equipment and to distortions in the economic valuation of different parts of the spectrum in the 700 MHz band. Although the dynamics of the market such as the ever-increasing complexity of chipsets, multi-band support by chip manufacturers demonstrate that the most likely outcome is the inclusion of both duplexers in all devices.
Additionally, whereas channel bandwidths up to 15 MHz can be supported anywhere within the band, channel bandwidths of 20 MHz are limited to the upper and lower parts of the band and may not be employed in the mid-portion of the band where the filters overlap.

As of 2014, most equipment vendors have released two versions of their radio units: one dedicated to the lower band and another one dedicated to the upper band. A notable alternative is provided by Alcatel-Lucent - their RRH2x40-07APT-4R radio unit covers the entire band 28 (45 MHz) within a single radio unit thus negating the need of sourcing two different radio unit variants.

Ecosystem

Incompatibility with the US band plan 

Frequency arrangements of the US band plan and the APT band plan substantially overlap thus making them largely incompatible. The 3GPP has designated five operating bands for the US band plan (Bands 12, 13, 14, 17, 29) and two bands for the APT band plan (Band 28 for FDD version and Band 44 for TDD version). There are distinct differences among the operating bands such as different channel bandwidths and channel locations within the 700 MHz band. More specifically, duplex spacing and guardband peculiarities of the APT band plan is what differentiates it most. US band plan, in its turn, is characterized by a number of inconsistencies: i) non-existence of in-band interoperability (i.e. devices working in band 13 are not compatible with devices working with in either of the bands 12, 14, 17); ii) harmful interference from TV channels; iii) absence of user equipment in Band 12 (it is also not likely to appear in the future)[EDIT 12/1/2014: Band 12 equipment is already available]; iv) no current use of the D and E blocks in the lower part of the 700 MHz band (there is a 12 MHz TDD frequency block); and some other issues. As a result of these peculiarities of segmentation, block A of the lower 700 MHz band is practically not used due to interference from TV Channel 51. Out of the total of 23x2 MHz of spectrum owned and used by AT&T and Verizon, 3x2 MHz cannot be used due to limitations by LTE technology standards - only blocks of 5, 10 MHz can be used according to 3GPP industry standards.

Compatibility of the APT band plan with the foreseen usage of the 700 MHz band in different regions of the world 

European countries, which still continue have a high occupancy of broadcasting services in the 700 MHz band that have been granted a period until 2015 to convert to digital. It appears that since the APT segmentation is based on two overlapping duplexers of 30+30 MHz, it fits perfectly in the European scheme, as shown on the graph below. This compatibility opens the way for the harmonization of the 700 MHz band with the European region. Japan, one of largest and most advanced Asian markets and the global technology leader is using the upper duplexer part of the APT band plan and thus will enjoy being the part of the ecosystem of the APT band plan too. This basically means that the terminals designed to work in the APT band plan will perfectly function in Europe and Japan, thus adding up to the size of the market that is being created by the APT band plan.
All facts mentioned above and the recent announcements from various governments indicate that the 700 MHz band in the FDD mode of the APT band plan is becoming one of the most harmonized band that exists in the world. This extent of harmonization will lead to economies of scale which will in turn drag down the prices of terminals, speed up adoption of smart devices and finally convert to socio-economic benefits.

User equipment 

At the given moment, the user equipment (UE) for this segmentation scheme has not yet been released commercially. In the same time, the development of 3GPP and ITU standards (bands 28 and 44) and evident signals that has been sent to the market by many countries in Asia, Latin America and elsewhere, indicate that technological developments of the required ecosystem (first of all, in terms of user equipment and network equipment) are currently underway. Some of the strongest signals for the future demand have been sent by large markets, such as Japan, India, Indonesia, and above all, Mexico. This country was the first large market in Americas to adopt the APT band plan despite historical path dependency and despite having a 3,000 km border with the USA which uses a different segmentation of the 700 MHz band. Another point that is worth to mention is that the standardization work that has been carried out by the 3GPP was strongly supported by many key companies from the industry. That also proves that the equipment manufacturers are in the process of the commercialization of UE and network elements driven by the creation of significant market by the APT band plan.
All that seems to indicate that first prototypes of APT devices will appear in the Q2 of 2013 and market releases are to be expected in the second half of 2013. In Latin America, for example, the National Spectrum Agency (ANE) of Colombia has announced that Huawei, ZTE and Ericsson will conduct tests in the band under the standard APT pipeline in the first quarter of 2013, using equipment developed by the leading manufacturers with the goal to auction off the spectrum in August 2013. Due to economies of scale that are being created by the APT band plan, the price of smart devices could then lower down significantly.

Current state and recent developments 

A significant number of countries have already adopted the APT segmentation scheme: Australia, India, Japan, Korea, the Philippines, New Zealand, Papua New Guinea, Taiwan, and Tonga in Asia; and Brazil, Costa-Rica, Colombia, Chile, Mexico, Ecuador, Panama and Argentina in Latin America. In countries such as Indonesia, Singapore, Thailand, Vietnam, Uruguay, Paraguay, Peru and a few others it is scheduled to be adopted in the nearest future.
In Europe, allocation of the 700 MHz band to mobile services implies challenges, acknowledged by the ITU-R in its decision that new allocations should not come into force until 2015 due to many countries in Europe having digital terrestrial television (DTT) services in 700 MHz band. That decision also takes into account the need for European countries to better study issues regarding the channel plan and to carry out compatibility studies regarding other services in the Region and on other topics, before taking final position on the best suitable allocation and associated regulation. However, once these issues are resolved, the APT band plan will become compatible with the usage of the 700 MHz band in Europe, whereas the US band plan will not.

Spectrum harmonization and potential economies of scale 

Generally speaking, it is very important that the spectrum is used in the same way across as many markets as possible to create economies of scale. That, in turn, leads to lower prices for the equipment thus increasing the adoption of the technology and having a direct and indirect impact on the economic growth. This growth consists of enhancement of productivity, job creation, entrepreneurship, infrastructure investment, taxation; all leading to GDP growth. According to the joint study of the GSMA and the Boston Consulting Group, the biggest socio-economic benefits are likely to arise by allocating the 700 MHz band to mobile services.

For example, by 2020, the allocation of 700 MHz band in Asia to mobile could generate a GDP increase of more than US$1 trillion (NPV of $960 billion) and tax revenue growth of US$215 billion, along with the creation of an additional 1.4 million new businesses (including new departments or business units within existing firms) and 2.7 million new jobs. Comparing allocation to mobile services and broadcasting services, which is another possible option of utilization of the 700 MHz band, the first option would lead to significant incremental economic benefits over the broadcasting services – in particular, an extra US$959 billion in GDP, by 2020, as well as additional tax revenues of US$171 billion, 1.4 million more business activities, and 2.6 million additional jobs, according to the study.

Creation of economies of scale is vital for mass production of equipment and its further adoption in target markets. Overall, the greater economies of scale are, the lesser end user prices will be established and the vaster will be the adoption of the technology that translates to socio-economic benefits. Speaking about the ecosystem availability timeframes, many stakeholders expect the APT band plan ecosystem to develop rapidly as countries identify and auction spectrum with this frequency arrangement.

Although there exists a rather small spectral overlap that theoretically provides some opportunities for manufacturing equipment that would be operable across both plans, there are important technical considerations that are certain to constrain practical radio-frequency (RF) designs to separate markets for two band plans of the 700 MHz band.

With the ongoing adoption of the LTE technology, future numerous deployments in the 700 MHz band and the advancements in the microelectronics, the user devices of the future might support multiple LTE bands and potentially could even include RF designs (antennas, band chips, duplexers, filters, oscillators and other circuitry) supporting both the US band plan and the APT band plan. However, at least in the short- and medium-term, there will be separate markets for UE in these two existing band plan configurations.

As is it forecasted as of today, the US band plan will solely be used in the US, Canada, Nicaragua and a handful of Caribbean islands. That, by itself, represents a significant market of an order of 410 million people.

However, the recent developments around the propagation of the APT band plan across Asia-Pacific region, Latin America, and thanks to the compatibility of the European frequency arrangements, as well as the situation in Africa and Middle East, project confidence that a far bigger market is being created worldwide. Summed up, the prospective overall market for the APT band plan translates to a figure of at the very least 3 billion people across the globe. With ongoing studies of the digital dividend in the world, that number is might increase and include nearly all the rest of the world. First and foremost, vast number of Asian-Pacific countries have already adopted the APT band plan. For the moment, combined markets of Australia, Bangladesh, India, Indonesia, Japan, New Zealand, Pakistan, Papua New Guinea, Philippines, Singapore and South Korea add up to around 2 billion 100 million people. In the Middle East and Africa region, Egypt, Kenya, Nigeria, South Africa and United Arab Emirates are likely to follow Europe in using partially the frequency arrangement of the APT band plan which makes them fall into the same category of ecosystems. The number of such countries of the region is bound to rise. These countries alone represent a market equal to the one of the US band plan – around 330 million people. In Latin America, Argentina, Brazil, Chile, Colombia, Ecuador, Mexico, Costa-Rica, Panama, Peru, Venezuela have all officially adopted the APT band plan while in the Caribbean, Trinidad and Tobago is the only country to have officially adopted the APT band plan. The logical outcome of the ongoing regional harmonization process in Americas will be the resulting market of an order of 400 million consumers. Given the size of the potential market that is on the verge of being created, the socio-economic benefits caused by booming access and adoption of the mobile internet by all social layers of population and driven by rocketing penetration of smart devices will be overwhelming and transformational.

Technical characteristics and considerations

Existing standards for the APT band plan 

The FDD mode of the APT band plan has been standardized by the 3GPP as the Band 28 (FDD 703-748 / 758 - 803 MHz) and the TDD mode - as the Band 44 (TDD 703 – 803 MHz). The work was completed at RAN4 #63 meeting in Czech Republic on May 21–25, 2012.

Table 4. Supported channel bandwidths for APT segmentation of the 700 MHz band

The following table outlines the main technical aspects of the standard that have been set at the 3GPP RAN4 Plenary in Slovenia on 13-15 of June 2012 in the R4-123624 for the FDD mode and in the R4-123696 for the TDD mode.

Table 5. Technical aspects of the standard of APT segmentation of the 700 MHz band

3GPP members who supported and contributed to this work include: Alcatel-Lucent, CATT, China Mobile, Ericsson, ETRI, HiSilicon, Huawei, KDDI, KT Corporation, LG Electronics Inc., LG-Ericsson Co. Ltd., Motorola Mobility, NII Holdings, Nokia, Nokia Siemens Networks, NTT DOCOMO, Qualcomm Inc., Samsung, ST-Ericsson, Telefónica S.A., Vodafone, ZTE.
The segmentation scheme called "A5" for the band 698-806 MHz, corresponding to the FDD mode of the APT band plan, is defined by the Recommendation of ITU-R M.1036-4 (3/2012) "Frequency Arrangements for Implementation of the terrestrial component of International Mobile Telecommunications (IMT) in the bands Identifies for IMT in the Radio Regulations (RR) "(ITU-R M.1036). The TDD version of the APT band plan is standardized as the “A6” segmentation scheme in accordance with the same Recommendation of ITU-R M.1036-4 (3/2012).
Current specifications can be found in 3GPP TS 36.101 v11.1.0 for the UE and 3GPP TS 36.104 v11.1.0 for the Base Stations. They correspond to the frequency arrangement of the Rec. ITU-R M.1036-4 (3-2012).

Technology 

The most favoured, popular mobile broadband technology internationally for the digital spectrum appears to be the FDD-LTE technology. LTE is known to offer operators and end users high data throughput and low latency which are the two main characteristics of a technology that is aimed to be used for data transmission. Peak speeds utilizing multiple antennas (MIMO) in optimal conditions are in excess of 300 Mbit/s. While actual speeds experienced by users will be dependent on equipment and the number of users connected to any cell, it is clear that LTE offers speeds which could result in a step-change in mobile broadband connectivity. The move to LTE is seen as the key next step for mobile network operators aiming to respond to the increasing demand for mobile data access. LTE offers greater spectral efficiency, allowing the provision of higher data speeds and greater data allowance, at lower cost. This will be particularly important for MNOs as average revenue per user from voice and text services falls. FDD-LTE offers a natural upgrade path from GSM and WCDMA technologies which are already widely implemented in New Zealand. It will be able to provide both mobile and fixed wireless broadband services. There is also growing interest from some manufacturers in using TDD-LTE in the 700 MHz band. This move is led mainly by equipment manufacturers and mobile network operators in China. At the current moment in time, though, the technology is largely untested.

Comparison of FDD and TDD modes of the APT band plan 

According to the estimates of Qualcomm, “in a coverage-limited system comparison using the same frequency band, the TDD system required 31% more base stations than FDD when using a 1:1 TDD system and 65% more base stations when using a 2:1 TDD system. Higher frequency bands required even more base stations.” Due to the fact that the major part of both capital and operational expenditures of operators have to do with base stations of the network, making their incurred costs directly proportional to the number of base stations, FDD deployments imply lower deployment and operating costs.

Duplexers 

The duplexer is a filter that provides isolation of the transmitter leakage to its own receiver. In a mobile connected device, the transmitter and receiver are linked to the same antenna by means of a duplexer. Duplexer isolation of > 45 dB is considered feasible by the industry. If the duplexer isolation is not sufficient then the handset may experience self-desensitization. Multi-mode, multi-band handsets often have mode- and band-specific duplexers. Duplexer technology affects choice of duplex separation and centre band gap which have been designed for the APT band plan with these considerations in mind.

Duplex Spacing 

Duplex spacing is the separation between the uplink channel and the corresponding downlink channel. A larger separation implies less likelihood of self-interference between a handset transmitter and its own receiver. Because a power amplifier out of band response is related to the bandwidth, the duplex separation requirement is also dependent on the carrier bandwidth in order to protect the receiver from self-interference. A duplex spacing of 30 MHz is sufficient to support carrier bandwidths of up to 10 MHz. This result is derived using 3GPP specification 3GPP 36.101.

Centre Gap 

Centre gap is a key characteristic of FDD-based frequency arrangement represented by the gap between frequency blocks assigned for downlink and uplink respectively in the FDD-based arrangement as illustrated in Figure 5. It is common understanding that the duplex spacing and centre gap influence the duplexer performance so that larger separation brings the better isolation performance between downlink and uplink. Technically, this size of spacing affects the duplexer performance in the following two technical aspects:
 Self-desensitization for FDD Mobile Stations (MS) and FDD Base Stations (BS)
 MS to MS interference and BS to BS interference

To prevent self-desensitization, a duplexer must attenuate Tx emissions at the own Rx frequency band below the Rx noise floor. This leads typically to at least a 45 dB attenuation requirement at the own Rx frequency band. Implementing this attenuation requirement is a simple matter with the suggested 2x50 MHz arrangement by the use of a dual duplexer because the own UL and DL bands are separated by much wider separation distance the 8 MHz that would have been the case if a single duplexer is applied. The centre gap will also determine whether competitive networks can share base station sites with minimum interference and protective site filtering complexity.

Guard bands 

 a lower guard-band of 5 MHz is allocated between 698 and 703 MHz to ensure protection from the interference from TV channels that are situated in the lower bands in certain countries and from cellular services in the 600 MHz band;
 an upper guard-band of 3 MHz is allocated between 803 and 806 MHz to ensure protection from the interference from existing upper cellular bands.

Dual Duplexer 

The maximum bandwidth of an RF filter or duplexer for a terminal at this frequency range is today around 30-35 MHz. Any arrangement that efficiently uses the 108 MHz bandwidth in the frequency range 698-806 MHz must thus have more than one duplexer. “Dual duplexer” means that the handset has 2 duplexers, one per sub band as illustrated in figure 8.

With the use of a dual duplexer arrangement the individual duplex spacing will be increased, providing at the same time more usable spectrum for FDD. With current technology it would not be possible to implement a passband of 50 MHz with a single duplex solution. The dual duplexer arrangement may lead to a 2x50 MHz FDD band plan. Dual duplexers are being specified today and would add to the number of band specific duplexers to be accommodated in handsets where physical space is at a premium.

As of 2014, most equipment vendors have released two versions of their radio units: one dedicated to the lower band and another one dedicated to the upper band. A notable alternative is provided by Alcatel-Lucent - their RRH2x40-07APT-4R radio unit covers the entire band 28 (45 MHz) within a single radio unit thus negating the need of sourcing two different radio unit variants.

Coexistence of different band plans 

Radio waves, due to its nature and physics, can cause harmful interference to networks and equipment operating in a different band plan, (i.e. in neighbouring countries). That is why coherent policies and technical frameworks are routinely developed by countries to mitigate such interference. The 700 MHz band is no exception and is currently regulated by mutual agreements between countries.

As a common practice to approach such issues, there are two possible scenarios to consider:

Both countries implement the same band plan. Adoption of similar band plans by neighbouring countries will ensure alignment of uplink and downlink spectrum blocks and co channel or adjacent channel interference scenarios can be managed by existing 3GPP specifications and existing bilateral treaties between the countries.
Both countries implement different band plans. The US and APT FDD band plans are incompatible in terms of the uplink and downlink patterns so there exists a need for coordination of spectrum along border areas. An example of this occurrence occurs at the U.S.-Mexico border. In some of such cases, the existing treaties and specification will still serve their purpose and can remain. Then, some additional engineering adjustments will be required for network deployments. The solution to this issue includes adjustments in transmitting antennas’ tilt, height, directivity, output power, or combination of those. With these protective measures, the harmful interference can be eradicated so that the radio electronic emissions at the border are kept within their mutually agreed norms.

References 

Bandplans
Telecommunications in Asia